The 2023 season will be the 16th season for the Indian Premier League franchise Gujarat Titans. They will be one of ten teams to compete in the 2023 Indian Premier League.The side have previously won the IPL title First times.

Franchise history 
The Governing Council of the Indian Premier League issued an invitation to tender for two new sides in August 2021. A total of 22 companies declared an interest, but with a high base price for the new teams, there were no more than six serious bidders. The Board of Control for Cricket in India allowed a consortium of three companies or individuals to bid for each franchise.

CVC Capital Partners has won the Ahmedabad franchise in the auction that was held in Dubai in October 2021.

Ahead of the IPL 2022 mega auction, the franchise drafted Hardik Pandya as their captain. The franchise also picked Shubman Gill and Rashid Khan.

The Ahmedabad franchise revealed the name of its cricket team as the Gujarat Titans on 9 February 2022.

Team identity

Team anthem
The team anthem used to be 'Aava De'. In the first 2022 IPL season, the song was sung by Aditya Gadhvi.

Home ground 
The team's home ground is Narendra Modi Stadium, which is situated in Motera, Gujarat.

Seasons

GT League Stage Matches

The schedule for the group stages was published on 17 February 2023.

Matches

Administration and support staff 2023

Current squad
 Players with international caps are listed in bold.

References

External links 
Official website

2023 Indian Premier League
2023